il Conquisto di Granata (The conquest of Granada) is an epic poem in 26 cantos by the Italian poet Girolamo Graziani first published in Modena in 1650. The poem tells the last year of the siege of Granada (Granada War) led by Ferdinand II of Aragon (Ferdinand The Catholic) with which ended the reconquista of the Muslim-controlled areas of the Iberian Peninsula broadly known as Al-Andalus.

Curiosity 
The plot (love in the imminence of death) and the names of the main characters (Consalvo and Elvira) has been the source for Giacomo Leopardi's Consalvo (1833).

Editions 
 Modena, Soliani, 1650 in -4°
 Napoli, Molo [Roberto Mollo?], 1651 in -12°
 Parigi, chez le Sieur des Rotieurs, 1654, 2 Tomi, in -12° (with French preface)
 Milano, Filippo Ghisolfi, 1666
 Bologna, Manolessi, 1670 in -24°
 Venezia, Combi e la Noù, 1684 in -12°
 Venezia, Zatta, 1768
 Colle Pacini, Eusebio, 1816, 2 Voll. in -12°
 In: Il Parnaso Italiano edited by A.Peretti e A.Cappelli, Antonelli, Venezia, 1832-1851, Volume II, pages XII+328

Bibliography 
 Antonio Peretti e A. Cappelli, Prefazione al «Conquisto di Granata», in: Il Parnaso Italiano, 2 vol., Venezia, Antonelli, 1832–51, vol. 2, pagg. I-XII.
 Antonio Belloni, Gli Epigoni della «Gerusalemme Liberata», Padova, Angelo Draghi, 1893, pages 320-43.
 Antonio Belloni, Di una probabile fonte del «Consalvo» di Giacomo Leopardi, Milano, Albighi-Segati, 1903, pages 261-8.
 Piero Di Nepi, Il «Conquisto di Granata» e l'epica del Seicento, "Il Veltro", Year XX (1976), no. 1/2, pages 94–104.
 Gian Piero Maragoni, L’onda e la spira. Saggio di ricerca sull’artificio anacronico nel "Conquisto di Granada" di Girolamo Graziani, Bulzoni, Roma, 1989.

Epic poems in Italian
1650 books
Romance (genre)
1650 poems